Vijendra Singh Khatik is an ex member of the Uttar Pradesh Legislative Assembly from the Khurja constituency in Bulandshahar district.

Early life and education
Khatik was born 22 June 1974 in Umasamur village Bulandshahr district of Uttar Pradesh to his father Hari Singh. In 1994, he married Dayawati Singh Khatik, they have two sons. He is literate.

Political career
Khatik started his journey in politics from the Block pramukh of Khurja. In 2017, 17th Legislative Assembly of Uttar Pradesh he was elected MLA from Khurja Assembly Constituency in Bulandashahar district of Uttar Pradesh. He defeated his nearest rival Bahujan Samaj Party candidate Arjun Singh by a huge margin of 64,299 votes.

Post held

References 

Living people
21st-century Indian politicians
Bharatiya Janata Party politicians from Uttar Pradesh
1974 births
People from Bulandshahr district
Uttar Pradesh MLAs 2017–2022